Theatre History Studies, founded in 1981, is the official journal of the Mid-America Theatre Conference. Published by University of Alabama Press, it is listed in Scimago and Arts and Humanities Citation Index. Issues since 2007 are accessible through MUSE.

References

History of theatre
University of Alabama
ISSN needed